Mongardino is a comune (municipality) in the Province of Asti in the Italian region Piedmont, located about  southeast of Turin and about  south of Asti.

Mongardino borders the following municipalities: Asti, Isola d'Asti, and Vigliano d'Asti.

References

External links
 Official website

Cities and towns in Piedmont